Nikolay Mikhaylovich Maksimov (born 15 November 1972) is a Russian water polo goalkeeper, who played at the 1996 Summer Olympics, on the silver medal squad at the 2000 Summer Olympics and the bronze medal squad at the 2004 Summer Olympics. He was the top goalkeeper at the 2004 Olympics, with 67 saves. He competed as part of the Kazakhstan National Team at the 2012 Summer Olympics. Before his Olympic career, he won bronze medals at the world championships in 1994 and European championships in 1997.

He graduated from the Moscow Institute of Pedagogy.

See also
 Russia men's Olympic water polo team records and statistics
 Kazakhstan men's Olympic water polo team records and statistics
 List of Olympic medalists in water polo (men)
 List of players who have appeared in multiple men's Olympic water polo tournaments
 List of men's Olympic water polo tournament goalkeepers
 List of World Aquatics Championships medalists in water polo

References

External links
 

1972 births
Living people
Sportspeople from Moscow
Kazakhstani people of Russian descent
Russian expatriate sportspeople in Kazakhstan
Russian male water polo players
Kazakhstani male water polo players
Water polo goalkeepers
Water polo players at the 1996 Summer Olympics
Water polo players at the 2000 Summer Olympics
Water polo players at the 2004 Summer Olympics
Olympic water polo players of Russia
Olympic silver medalists for Russia
Olympic bronze medalists for Russia
Olympic medalists in water polo
Olympic water polo players of Kazakhstan
Water polo players at the 2012 Summer Olympics
Asian Games medalists in water polo
Water polo players at the 2010 Asian Games
Medalists at the 2004 Summer Olympics
Medalists at the 2000 Summer Olympics
World Aquatics Championships medalists in water polo
Asian Games gold medalists for Kazakhstan
Medalists at the 2010 Asian Games
Russian water polo coaches